Kangalal Kaidhu Sei is a 2004 Indian Tamil-language musical romantic thriller film written by Sujatha and directed by Bharathiraja. It stars Vaseegaran in the protagonist's role and marks Priyamani's debut in the Tamil cinema. It also marks the only Tamil film performance by the veteran Sri Lankan actor Sanath Gunathilake. The cinematography was done by B. Kannan, while editing was done by K. Pazhanivel. The music was scored by A. R. Rahman, marking his fifth and final collaboration with Bharathiraja. The film revolves around a young, wealthy kleptomaniac's quest to find the love of his dreams in a young woman who is tasked to retrieve a stolen diamond from him.

This film was released on 20 February 2004. It received mixed reviews and became a box office failure. However it achieved a cult status over the years.

Plot 
John Vaseegaran, also called "Vasee", is a young man who ranks as the 5th richest man in India and 30th in the world. In business, his major rival is Pratap, who was earlier a rival to Vasee's parents. The plot opens in a graveyard where his parents' funeral takes place. Vasee is not disturbed by the demise of his parents as he has not been showered with any affection by them. Instead they spent their attention only on developing their business and making money. A lady attending the funeral expresses her condolence to Vasee and leaves. While getting into her car she finds that her diamond ring is missing and starts shouting. Pratap, who is also present there, hears her. Vasee quietly takes out the ring from his pocket and puts it back there.

Soon, Vasee, at the age of 21, inherits the property of his parents and becomes the chairman of 42 companies. However he is unhappy in his life and yearns for motherly affection. Besides, he is also a kleptomaniac. He consults his family doctor for a solution. The doctor instructs him to find love, which makes him dream of a loving, maternal figure named "Cinderella" based on the fairytale character of the same name.

Vidhya, a young woman working in a shopping mall run by Pratap, sees Vasee stealing a crystal from the shopping mall. Later, a diamond exhibition is organized, and Pratap is exhibiting his special diamond with 16 reflecting faces, which is worth ₹10 crore. This diamond is under the responsibility of Vidhya. She notices Vasee at the exhibition and becomes alert. Shortly afterwards, Vasee steals the diamond in spite of tight security and leaves. Vidhya is questioned by police and charged with theft. Under interrogation Vidhya remembers Vasee's presence and relates the old incident of crystal theft. She immediately understands that Vasee is the thief and tells the police, but the police do not believe her as he is a wealthy man. But Pratap believes her as he remembers the diamond ring theft in the graveyard. In fact, Pratap himself once lost a golden wristlet while shaking Vasee's hand.

As per Pratap's plan, Vidhya enters Vasee's home as his personal secretary. Vasee asks her to dress in modern attire, and she does so. He sees his dream girl Cinderella in Vidhya and starts developing love for her, but she is not interested in him. Meanwhile, Vidhya searches for the diamond and spots it in a big fish tank. Soon, she is asked to accompany Vasee to the airport from which he is to take a plane for attending a meeting. Vidhya suddenly disappears when she notices Vasee's doctor. Soon, Vasee too rushes home when informed by the doctor that Vidhya and a police officer named Premkumar met him for an inquiry about Vasee. At home, he sees the broken fish tank and understands that Vidhya took the diamond. Vidhya is happy as she is relieved from the first charge, but is soon charged again for theft.

The diamond taken from Vasee by Vidhya is not the original one, but a fake made from crystal. Pratap demands Vidhya to have an illicit relation with him in return for her discharge from the case. Vidhya rushes to Vasee and pleads him to give back the diamond as it destroys her future and life. She expresses that she cannot be in love with him or marry him. Then Premkumar arrives, reveals to Vasee that he is Vidhya's fiancé and threatens to get him caught and jailed. However Vidhya undergoes torture under police custody for her second charge and Premkumar is rendered powerless in proving Vidhya's innocence. Then Vasee bails Vidhya from police custody and demands her to be his Cinderella for five days in Switzerland as a punishment for attacking him psychologically with love as a weapon. He assures no physical contact but only love. Vidhya initially refuses, but due to the pressure from Premkumar to save his position, she agrees to go with Vasee.

At the Swiss airport, Vidhya bumps into an Interpol officer who introduces himself as Kailash. Vasee takes her to his Swiss residence and introduces her to all of his friends, teachers, etc. Then he and Vidhya poses for photographs. That night Vidhya has a nightmare of Vasee misbehaving with her. The next day, she breaks one of the photographs out of frustration. Later that day, Vasee sees Vidhya talking to Kailash from a distance. When he enters, he sees the broken pieces of the photograph. Vasee confronts Vidhya and screams at her that it is his family photo and that she has no rights to break it. The next day, Kailash finds Vasee alone at a church talking to himself. Later he is similarly spotted alone on a hilltop. Likewise on the fourth day, he is seen talking to himself on a boat on Lake Thun. Kailash quickly informs the officers in India and in Switzerland. They immediately rush to Vasee's home to rescue Vidhya. But they find only the dead bodies of Vasee and Vidhya dressed in groom and bride costumes. They also find Pratap's diamond placed on Vidhya's coffin. Vasee actually slapped Vidhya on the day that she broke the photograph. Unexpectedly, she died by dashing into a heavy stone, after which, Vasee dressed Vidhya's body in a bridal gown and preserved her in a coffin. As soon as the cops arrive during the fifth day, Vasee, dressed in a bridegroom's suit, shoots himself with his golden gun. The cops also see a note on the top of Vidhya's coffin, in which Vasee instructs the authorities to spend his property in the name of Cinderella Trust to help the poor and needy.

Cast 

 Vaseegaran as John Vaseegaran
 Priyamani as Vidhya/Cinderella
 Sanath Gunathilake as Pratap
 Akash as Premkumar
 Mayilsamy as Barber
 Chitra Lakshmanan as Subramaniam
 S. Premnath as James
 Theni Murugan as Vanadurai
 V. Swaminathan as Kailash
 G. Venugopal
 B. Kannan as John Vaseegaran's family friend
 G. K. as Director general of police
 Shanthi Kumar
 Laxmi Rattan as Dominic Louis Mariadas
 Lathamani
 Panduga
 Ilavarasu as John Vaseegaran's servant (uncredited role)

Production 
Bharathiraja had initially selected Rathi Arumugam to play the lead role, but she was later dropped from the project. Priyamani, who worked as a model for various advertisements, was subsequently selected for the role after a series of screen tests and the film marked her debut in Tamil cinema. Vaseegaran from Palladam, whose birth name is Fazal Ahmed, also worked as a model before being selected for his role through screen tests. He was given the screen name Vaseegaran when he made his debut in this film. Both Vaseegaran and Priyamani were positively reviewed for their respective performances in the film.

The climax scene was shot in Switzerland and so were a couple of songs. One of the songs was picturised at the airport, where Vaseegaran and Priyamani took part. Earlier, a 36 days' shooting schedule was held at Sri Lanka. After this the unit shifted to locations in Chennai and Ooty.

Soundtrack 
The soundtrack has 5 tracks composed by A. R. Rahman and an introductory speech by the film's director Bharathiraja. Lyrics were written by Pa. Vijay, Thenmozhi and Kabilan. The soundtrack got high critical acclaim and immediate praise. One of the tracks features vocals by noted Malayalam film score composer Johnson.

References

External links 

2000s heist films
2000s romantic thriller films
2000s Tamil-language films
2004 films
Films directed by Bharathiraja
Films scored by A. R. Rahman
Films set in Switzerland
Films shot in Chennai
Films shot in Ooty
Films shot in Sri Lanka
Films shot in Switzerland
Indian heist films
Indian romantic thriller films